Uya is a rural locality (a settlement) in Bauntovsky District, Republic of Buryatia, Russia. The population was 3 as of 2010. There is 1 street.

References 

Rural localities in Bauntovsky District